Pine Creek High School (PCHS) is a public high school in Academy School District 20 that serves the Pine Creek, Gleneagle, Black Forest, Northgate, Cordera, and Flying Horse Ranch neighborhoods of north Colorado Springs, Colorado. The school opened in 1998.

References

External links 
 
 Academy School District 20

High schools in Colorado Springs, Colorado
Educational institutions established in 1998
Public high schools in Colorado
1998 establishments in Colorado